Eric Krönmark (born 2 June 1931) is a Swedish Moderate Politician. He was Minister of Defence between 1976 and 1978 and again from 1979 until 1981. He also represented Kalmar as Member of Parliament in Sweden from 1965 to 1981. From 1981 to 1996 he was Governor of Kalmar County. He was noted for his Conservative views in the Moderate Party.

References

1931 births
Living people
Swedish Ministers for Defence
Moderate Party politicians